The women's 400 metres hurdles at the 2013 World Championships in Athletics was held at the Luzhniki Stadium on 12–15 August.

Running on home soil, reigning Olympic Champion Natalya Antyukh might have been expected to be the favorite.  Instead she made a quick exit, finishing sixth in her semifinal.  The Olympic silver medalist from that close Olympic final is the returning champion Lashinda Demus, but having a bye, she has raced sparingly.  She ran her season best to qualify in that same semi.  The distant bronze medalist Zuzana Hejnová in 2012 was the 2013 world leader.  She won the first semi, almost half a second faster than the other qualifiers.  Perri Shakes-Drayton won the second semi passing a fading Demus.

In the final, Hejnová in lane 3 was first to the first hurdle but backed off.  It was Demus took off in lane 4 and was the leader down the back stretch, with training partner Dalilah Muhammad almost on the same pace.  Both are trained by Demus' mom.  Shakes-Drayton between them tried to keep up with the two Americans.  Hejnová was gaining steadily on Demus and Muhammad through the turn.  Demus, who still holds the American high school record in the 300 hurdles did that distance well, but Hejnová, who set the world best in that race just two weeks earlier, passed her over the 8th hurdle at 290 meters.  Demus' arm carry noticeably dropped, she had played her best card and Hejnová had trumped it.  Hejnová continued ahead to victory with Demus fighting to stay with her.  Muhammad caught Demus with 10 meters to go for silver.  Demus a step back for bronze.  Shakes-Drayton disappeared back through the field, nobody else was in contention with the three clear winners.  Hejnová's 52.83 is the Czech national record and makes her the number 12 performer of all time (Demus already number 3).

Records
Prior to the competition, the records were as follows:

Qualification standards

Schedule

Results

Heats
Qualification: First 3 in each heat (Q) and the next 4 fastest (q) advanced to the semifinals.

Semifinals
Qualification: First 3 in each heat (Q) and the next 2 fastest (q) advanced to the final.

Final
The final was started at 20:45.

References

External links
400 metres hurdles results at IAAF website

400 metres hurdles
400 metres hurdles at the World Athletics Championships
2013 in women's athletics